is a large oil-fired and gas-fired power station in Kamisu, Ibaraki, Japan. 
The facility operates with an installed capacity of 5,660 MW, making it one of the largest fossil-fueled power station in the world. 
The plant includes four oil-fired steam turbines rated at 600 MW, two oil-fired steam turbines rated at 1,000 MW, and three advanced combined cycle gas turbines rated at 420 MW added in 2014. 
As of April 2016, the four oil-fired 600 MW turbines have been suspended indefinitely. The plant features 3 lattice stacks, including the tallest steel chimney in the world at 231m (758 ft).

See also 

 List of largest power stations in the world
 List of power stations in Japan
 Lattice tower

References 

Oil-fired power stations in Japan
Tokyo Electric Power Company
1971 establishments in Japan
Energy infrastructure completed in 1971
Buildings and structures in Ibaraki Prefecture
Kamisu